Usban (or osban) is a traditional kind of sausage in some North African countries  Algeria, Tunisia and Libya, stuffed with a mixture of rice, herbs, lamb, chopped liver and heart. This dish is usually served alongside the main meal of rice or couscous, often on special occasions.

Several varieties of usban exist, and the herbs and spices used can vary but typically include cayenne pepper, black pepper, turmeric and cinnamon, as well as dried mint, parsley and dill. This is added to spring onion, tomato, vegetable oil and rice. The mixture is stuffed into sheep intestines or commercial sausage casings and then tied off at the ends using thread. The sausages cook for an hour in a pot and are then browned in a frying pan or oven.

See also
 List of Middle Eastern dishes
 List of African dishes
 List of stuffed dishes

References

External links 

Libya our Home. http://www.libya-watanona.com/food/f31oct2b.htm

Arab cuisine
Egyptian cuisine
Tunisian cuisine
Libyan cuisine
Stuffed dishes
National dishes
Middle Eastern cuisine